Barrie Wright (born 6 November 1945) is an English former professional footballer who played as a left back. Active in England and the United States, Wright made nearly 100 appearances in an 8-year career.

Career
Born in Bradford, Wright played professionally in England and the United States for Leeds United, the New York Generals, Brighton & Hove Albion, Hartlepool United, Bradford Park Avenue, Gainsborough Trinity and Thackley.

References

1945 births
Living people
English footballers
English expatriate footballers
Expatriate soccer players in the United States
English expatriate sportspeople in the United States
Leeds United F.C. players
New York Generals (NPSL) players
New York Generals players
Brighton & Hove Albion F.C. players
Hartlepool United F.C. players
Bradford (Park Avenue) A.F.C. players
Gainsborough Trinity F.C. players
Thackley F.C. players
English Football League players
National Professional Soccer League (1967) players
North American Soccer League (1968–1984) players
Association football fullbacks